Ramkumar Bohra (2 August 1928 – 11 October 1991) was an Indian film producer / director / actor / screenwriter. Originally from Jodhpur, Rajasthan, he came to Bombay in 1947 to pursue a career in film.  He, along with his brother Shree Ram Bohra, founded Bohra Bros in 1948. His grandson is actor Karanvir Bohra.

Filmography

References

 
 

1928 births
1991 deaths
20th-century Indian film directors
Film producers from Rajasthan
People from Jodhpur
Film directors from Rajasthan
Hindi film producers
Hindi-language film directors